The Chino Hills are a mountain range on the border of Orange, Los Angeles, and San Bernardino counties, California, with a small portion in Riverside County. The Chino Hills State Park preserves open space and habitat in them.

Geography

The Chino Hills are separated from the Santa Ana Mountains to the south by the Santa Ana River (Santa Ana Canyon). On the northwest, Brea Canyon separates the Chino Hills from the Puente Hills. To the north of the Puente Hills and San Jose Creek lie the San Jose Hills. The only paved road crossing the Chino Hills is Carbon Canyon Road (State Route 142).

Flora
The Chino Hills are in the California chaparral and woodlands ecoregion of the California Floristic Province. The California native plants here are in the chaparral and oak woodland plant communities, with remnant stands of native grasses of California.

Chino Hills earthquake

It occurred at 11:42 am PDT and caused structural damage to buildings, including to St. Jude Centers for Rehabilitation and Wellness and to the Pomona City Hall. Water mains were ruptured in limited areas of Los Angeles, and superficial damage was done to the facades of businesses and other buildings. Many businesses, including Wal-Mart, reported damage to merchandise which was knocked to the floor and South Coast Plaza in Costa Mesa suffered damage to a portion of the ceiling which was knocked to the chair of a restaurant.

There were reports of minor injuries but no fatalities.

Fauna
The famed cliff swallows of Mission San Juan Capistrano are now nesting in Chino Hills. Thousands of the small birds, up from 'wintering' in Argentina, have built their mud nests in the eaves of the Vellano Country Club, a community situated around a golf course in the hills.

Adjacent ranges
Puente Hills
San Rafael Hills
San Joaquin Hills
Santa Ana Mountains
San Gabriel Mountains
San Bernardino Mountains

See also
Pasinogna, California
Rancho Santa Ana del Chino
Chino Hills State Park

References

 01
Hills of California
Peninsular Ranges
Mountain ranges of Los Angeles County, California
Mountain ranges of Orange County, California
Mountain ranges of San Bernardino County, California
Mountain ranges of Southern California
Chino, California
Hills